John Pray (17 March 1872 – 1948) was a footballer who played in the English Football League for Bury. He spent his early career with hometown club Falkirk and had short spells at Scottish Football League clubs Rangers and St Bernard's either side of his six seasons in England with Bury, during which he won the FA Cup in 1900.

References

Scottish footballers
Bury F.C. players
Rangers F.C. players
Footballers from Falkirk
Falkirk F.C. players
St Bernard's F.C. players
English Football League players
Scottish Football League players
1872 births
1948 deaths
Association football wing halves
Association football central defenders
Scottish emigrants to Canada
FA Cup Final players